Jaysingrao Gaikwad Patil (born 1 November 1949 in Kille Dharur in Beed district of Maharashtra) represented the Beed constituency of Maharashtra two times as member of Bharatiya Janata Party and later as member of the Nationalist Congress Party (NCP). He didn't contest the 15th Lok Sabha election.
He has now resigned from BJP on 17 Nov 2020 and joined Nationalist Congress Party on 24 Nov 2020

References

Living people
1949 births
People from Maharashtra
India MPs 2004–2009
India MPs 1999–2004
India MPs 1998–1999
Marathi politicians
Bharatiya Janata Party politicians from Maharashtra
People from Beed district
Members of the Maharashtra Legislative Council
Lok Sabha members from Maharashtra
People from Marathwada
Nationalist Congress Party politicians